Bankia carinata is a species of bivalves belonging to the family Teredinidae.

The species has almost cosmopolitan distribution.

References

Bivalves described in 1827